A suicidal person is one who is experiencing a personal suicide crisis; that is the person is attempting suicide, is seeking a means to die by suicide, or is contemplating suicide.

Recognizing a suicidal person

A suicidal person may exhibit certain behaviors. A person who has a preoccupation with death, talks excessively about suicide, or becomes socially withdrawn may be contemplating suicide. Other behaviors in suicidal people include reckless behaviors (such as increased drug and alcohol use, or taking unnecessary risks like dangerous driving), unexpected or unusual farewells to family and friends, and seeking out means to kill themselves (such as acquiring pills, guns, or other lethal objects).

Causes
See Discussion on causes of suicide for more information.

In many cases, suicide is an attempt to escape a situation that causes unbearable suffering. A majority of those that die by suicide suffer from depression, alcoholism, or mental health problems such as bipolar disorder. Some that die by suicide have organic disorders such as brain trauma and epilepsy.

Views on suicidal people

Legal
For much of history, people that attempted suicide were seen as violating laws against murder. By the eleventh century, courts "regarded suicide as 'murder of oneself'" and was "therefore viewed...as a criminal act." These legal repercussions for suicide have existed until modern times. England had laws against suicide until 1961, and between 1946 and 1956 "over 5,000 [people] were found guilty [of attempting suicide] and sentenced to either jail or prison." The United States too had laws against suicide as late as 1964, and Islamic holy law also forbids suicide.

Other factors
Other factors that influence suicidal people are families with a history of suicide and cultural or religious beliefs that glorify suicide.

See also
Suicide
Suicidal ideation
Suicide intervention

Notes and references

Suicide